Dimitrios Chatziisaias (born 21 September 1992) is a Greek professional footballer who plays as a centre-back for Super League club Atromitos.

Career

Panionios
In June 2014 Panionios and AO Chania came to an agreement for the movement of Chatziisaias to the club based in Athens.

PAOK
On 29 January 2016, PAOK confirmed that Chatziisaias would join the club on 1 February 2016 from Panionios for a club record transfer fee of €1 million, after agreeing terms and signing a three and a half years' contract. He was presented to themedia as a PAOK player on 1 February, where he was handed the number 5 shirt. Chatziisaias made his PAOK debut on 7 February, in a 1–0 away loss against champions Olympiacos. His first goal came a month later with a kick after an assist of Dimitris Pelkas in PAOK's 2–1 away loss against Panthrakikos.
On 19 August 2016, PAOK officially announced that the international defender is not in club's plans for the 2016–17 season. On 20 December 2016, Chatziisaias returned to the first team of PAOK immediately, in order to replace experienced international Georgios Tzavellas. Then, there were only stoppers Stelios Malezas, José Ángel Crespo and Fernando Varela in the current squad of the club, so his return was necessary ahead of the upcoming difficult matches in January.

Loan to Atromitos
On 26 June 2017, he signed a long season contract with Atromitos on loan from PAOK. On 30 June 2018, Greek central defender Chatziisaias will finally still be a member of ambitious Atromitos, on loan from PAOK until the end of 2018–19 season. The 26-year-old scored one goal (at 1–0 away victory over Asteras Tripolis in February) at 32 performances in the domestic competitions with the shirt of Austrian manager Damir Canadi's team during 2017–18 season.

Çaykur Rizespor
On 23 July 2019, Çaykur Rizespor announced the signing of Chatziisaias with a transfer fee in the region of €500,000, after the acquisition of Enea Mihaj from Panetolikos. 
PAOK would keep a resale rate of 20% and would also receive extra bonuses if Rizespor secures a European ticket for the upcoming season. Chatziisaias signed a three-year contract with a contract fee of €1,95 million.

Loan to Cercle Brugge
On 16 January 2020, Cercle Brugge and Çaykur Rizespor reached an agreement regarding the temporary transfer of Chatziisaias. Being on loan until the end of this season, there is a purchase option at the end.

Return to Atromitos 
On 2 July 2021, his return to Atromitos was announced, having signed a two-year contract.

Career statistics

Club

Honours
PAOK
Greek Cup: 2016–17

References

External links
 
 
 
 

1992 births
Living people
Greek footballers
A.O. Glyfada players
AO Chania F.C. players
Panionios F.C. players
PAOK FC players
Atromitos F.C. players
Super League Greece players
Süper Lig players
Belgian Pro League players
Football League (Greece) players
Association football defenders
Greek expatriate footballers
Expatriate footballers in Turkey
Expatriate footballers in Belgium
Çaykur Rizespor footballers
Cercle Brugge K.S.V. players
Greek expatriate sportspeople in Turkey
Greek expatriate sportspeople in Belgium
Footballers from Thessaloniki